The 2011 Akwa Ibom State gubernatorial election was the 5th gubernatorial election of Akwa Ibom State. Held on April 26, 2011, the People's Democratic Party nominee Godswill Akpabio won the election, defeating John James Akpan Udo-Edehe of the Action Congress of Nigeria.

Results 
A total of 14 candidates contested in the election. Godswill Akpabio from the People's Democratic Party won the election, defeating John James Akpan Udo-Edehe from the Action Congress of Nigeria. Valid votes was 1,148,433.

References 

Akwa Ibom State gubernatorial elections
Akwa Ibom gubernatorial